{{DISPLAYTITLE:Vitamin D5}}

Vitamin D5 (sitocalciferol) is a form of vitamin D.

Research 
Analogs of calcitriol, a form of vitamin D3, have been proposed for use as antitumor agents. Studies on vitamin D3 have shown inhibition of cell proliferation in prostate cancer, but high doses of vitamin D3 result in hypercalcemia. The effects of vitamin D5 on prostate cancer have also been studied, and unlike vitamin D3, vitamin D5 does not cause hypercalcemia while inhibiting tumor cell proliferation. The most researched analogue of vitamin D5 as an antitumor agent is 1α-hydroxyvitamin D5.

1α-Hydroxyvitamin D5 

1α-Hydroxyvitamin D5 is a chemical derivative of vitamin D5. The motive to study 1α-hydroxyvitamin D5 as a potential pharmaceutical drug stemmed from the tendency of calcitriol, a natural metabolite produced in the kidney, to cause toxic hypercalcemia in patients when dosed at concentrations needed to interrupt prostate cancer cells' cycle and stimulate apoptosis. And while supplementation with dexamethasone decreases hypercalcemia, bypassing it with an equally effective tumor suppressant would reduce patient cost and stress. Thus, the therapeutic effects of 1α-Hydroxyvitamin D5 as a potential antitumor agent without the side effects of calcitriol became a topic of study.

1α-Hydroxyvitamin D5 was first synthesized in 1997 by researchers in the Department of Chemistry at the University of Chicago, under Robert M. Moriarty and Dragos Albinescu. By 2005, the group had revised its synthesis method for a more streamlined, higher yield-producing route. It involved the photochemical conversion of precursor 7-dehydrositosteryl acetate to contain a conjugated triene system, a hallmark of this analog, followed by hydroxylation, photoisomerization, and deprotection steps. Their overall yield was 48%.

See also 
 7-Dehydrositosterol
 Calcipotriene

References 

Vitamin D